Action is a 1980 Italian black comedy directed by Tinto Brass. The film is reminiscent of the director's earlier avant-garde low-budget works such as The Howl and Nerosubianco.

Brass faced many difficulties in Italy due to lawsuits concerning the production of Caligula so he filmed Action in London in 1979.

Plot
Bruno Martel (Luc Merenda) is a "Z movie" actor with hero syndrome, often quarrelling with directors. He meets Doris (Susanna Javicoli) an actress who is obsessed with Ophelia but cannot get any Shakespearean bookings. One day, during a nervous breakdown, Bruno "rescues" Doris from the set, leaving the town to encounter various absurd situations. They meet an old anarchist (Alberto Sorrentino) who thinks he is Giuseppe Garibaldi and the three are locked at a mental asylum where Doris commits suicide. Bruno and "Garibaldi" escape and take refuge at an awkward petrol station run by Florence (Adriana Asti) and her invalid husband Joe (Alberto Lupo).

Cast
Luc Merenda: Bruno Martel
Adriana Asti: Florence
Susanna Javicoli: Doris / Ofelia
Paola Senatore: Ann Shimpton
Alberto Sorrentino: Garibaldi
Alberto Lupo: Joe
John Steiner: the manager
Franco Fabrizi: the producer
Tinto Brass: the director (cameo)
: the director
Giancarlo Badessi
Edoardo Florio
Luciano Crovato
: leader of the thugs
Alina De Simone
Beatrice Brass
Hélène Chauvin
Gigi D'Ecclesia

Release
In Germany, the film was released as Sodom 2000.

Reception
According to Italian film critic Marco Giusti, Action is for many the cult film among Tinto Brass' films. Giusti praises the finale with the dream of Luc Merenda, who sees four knights who have sexes in place of their noses and four women who have sexes in place of their mouthes.

Bibliography

References

External links

1980 films
Italian black comedy films
Films shot in London
Films directed by Tinto Brass
1980s black comedy films
Films set in psychiatric hospitals
Cultural depictions of Giuseppe Garibaldi
1980s Italian-language films
1980s Italian films